Rupinder Inderjit is a film and television writer. Rupinder Inderjit is a Film writer and director, best known for his highly acclaimed film Surkhi Bindi. According to The Tribune "It’s not the regular Punjabi comedy but is surely a subject that invokes your sensibilities subtly." He got great reviews for his first directional venture, a short film, Khoon Aali Chithi, written and directed by him. Rahul Desai from Film Companion gave it three stars "Khoon Aali Chithi serves as a jittery bridge connecting not only two distinct modes of rupi oye storytelling, but also contemporary Punjabi cinema’s mutually exclusive pillars: history and populism.

Early life
Rupinder Inderjit belongs to village Dholan, Tehsil Jagraon, District Ludhiana, Punjab. He did his schooling from Guru Hargobind Public Senior Secondary School, Sidhwan Khurd. He was very young when he had read Raj Kapoor's published personal diary. He was so inspired that he decided to be a storyteller through films. He loves Punjabi literature especially works of the well known Punjabi poet Shiv Kumar Batalvi. He holds a Master's degree from Panjab University, Chandigarh in Anthropology with distinction and a university Gold Medal. He worked in market research for 6 years before moving on to developing a full-time writing career.

Filmography

References

External links

 
 
https://in.bookmyshow.com/person/rupinder-inderjit/39359

Living people
Punjabi people
Year of birth missing (living people)